Manuel Castellano may refer to:

Manuel Castellano (painter) (1826-1880), Spanish painter
Lillo (footballer) (Manuel Castellano Castro, born 1989), Spanish footballer